Events from the year 1599 in India.

Events
 20 June – Synod of Diamper
 Nauraspur founded by Ibrahim Adil Shah II (destroyed 1624).

Births

Deaths
 Chand Bibi, warrior and acting Regent of Bijapur (1580–90) and regent of Ahmednagar (1596–99) (born 1550)
 Sant Eknath writer (born in 1533)

See also

 1599
 Timeline of Indian history

References

 
India
16th century in India